Blapsilon irroratum is a species of beetle in the family Cerambycidae. It was described by Francis Polkinghorne Pascoe in 1860. It is known from New Caledonia.

References

Tmesisternini
Beetles described in 1860